56th meridian may refer to:

56th meridian east, a line of longitude east of the Greenwich Meridian
56th meridian west, a line of longitude west of the Greenwich Meridian